Alexander Peya and Bruno Soares were the two-time defending champions, but lost in the semifinals to Bob and Mike Bryan.
The Bryan brothers went on to win the title, defeating Daniel Nestor and Édouard Roger-Vasselin in the final, 7–6(7–5), 3–6, [10–6].

Seeds
All seeds received a bye into the second round.

Draw

Finals

Top half

Bottom half

References

Men's Doubles